Suvad Katana (6 April 1969 – 8 January 2005) was a Bosnian professional footballer who played as a sweeper.

Club career
Katana started playing football in Željezničar as a youngster. He made his league debut for the club in the 1987–88  season against Red Star Belgrade (0–0). Although still a teenager, he was a regular starter in the squad in the following seasons.

In 1992, War in Bosnia started and Katana fled to Switzerland with Gordan Vidović and Mario Stanić and subsequently moved to Belgium. He played there for Genk (1992–1994), Gent (1994–1996) and Anderlecht (1996–1998). After a season with Turkish side Adanaspor, he returned to Belgium and played for Lokeren (1999–2004). He ended his career in 2004 after suffering from persistent knee injuries.

He was one of the best defenders in the Belgian championship during the 1990s. He won many awards for his performances at various clubs.

International career
Katana also played for the Bosnia and Herzegovina national team. His first game was against Albania on 24 April 1996, and last on 15 October 1998 against Lithuania. In total, he collected ten caps for the national team.

Personal life
After retiring as a player, the bold-headed Katana worked in former teammate Vidović's real estate company. 

In January 2005, Katana died in Sarajevo after suffering a cardiac arrest, aged 35. He was survived by his wife and two children.

References

External links

Profile at TFF.org

1969 births
2005 deaths
People from Sarajevo Canton
Bosniaks of Bosnia and Herzegovina
Yugoslav Wars refugees
Association football sweepers
Yugoslav footballers
Bosnia and Herzegovina footballers
Bosnia and Herzegovina international footballers
FK Željezničar Sarajevo players
K.R.C. Genk players
K.A.A. Gent players
R.S.C. Anderlecht players
Adanaspor footballers
K.S.C. Lokeren Oost-Vlaanderen players
Yugoslav First League players
Belgian Pro League players
Süper Lig players
Bosnia and Herzegovina expatriate footballers
Expatriate footballers in Belgium
Bosnia and Herzegovina expatriate sportspeople in Belgium
Expatriate footballers in Turkey
Bosnia and Herzegovina expatriate sportspeople in Turkey